This is a list of Belgian television related events from 1982.

Events
21 February - Stella is selected to represent Belgium at the 1982 Eurovision Song Contest with her song "Si tu aimes ma musique". She is selected to be the twenty-seventh Belgian Eurovision entry during Eurosong held at the RTBF Studios in Brussels.

Debuts

Television shows

1980s
Tik Tak (1981-1991)

Ending this year

Births
8 January - Ronny Daelman, actor
9 February - Guillaume Devos, actor
30 October - Lien Van de Kelder, actress

Deaths